The 2002 Bayern Rundfahrt was the 14th edition of the Bayern Rundfahrt cycle race and was held on 22–26 May 2002. The race started in Füssen and finished in Neumarkt in der Oberpfalz. The race was won by Michael Rich.

General classification

References

Bayern-Rundfahrt
2002 in German sport